Below are lists of newspapers organized by continent.

Africa

Asia

Europe

North America

Oceania

South America

See also
 
Newspaper of record